Panayiotis Loizides may refer to:
 Panayiotis Loizides (footballer) (born 1995), Cypriot footballer
 Panayiotis Loizides (businessman), Cypriot businessman